Emmanuel Lamarr "E. J." Bibbs Jr. (born August 28, 1991) is an American football tight end for the New Orleans Breakers of the United States Football League (USFL). He was signed by the Cleveland Browns as an undrafted free agent in 2015. He played college football at Iowa State.

Early life
Bibbs attended Bogan High School in Chicago where he starred at both wide receiver and linebacker.

College career
Bibbs originally committed to the University of Iowa before beginning his collegiate career at Arizona Western Community College.  After one season at Arizona Western, Bibbs transferred to Iowa State.

Bibbs caught 84 passes for 844 yards and ten touchdowns in two seasons for the Cyclones.  Bibbs was a John Mackey Award finalist and first-team all Big 12 Conference in 2014.

Professional career

Cleveland Browns
After going unselected in the 2015 NFL Draft, Bibbs signed with the Cleveland Browns on May 3, 2015. He appeared in seven games his rookie year and had one reception for seven yards.

He was released by the Browns on August 29, 2016. He was re-signed to the practice squad on October 5, 2016. He was released by the Browns on October 18, 2016.

Jacksonville Jaguars
On November 22, 2016, Bibbs was signed to the Jaguars' practice squad. He was released on November 29, 2016. He was re-signed to the practice squad on December 7, 2016. He signed a reserve/future contract with the Jaguars on January 2, 2017. On May 1, 2017, Bibbs was released.

Washington Redskins
Bibbs was signed by the Washington Redskins on July 27, 2017. He was waived/injured on September 2, 2017 and placed on injured reserve. The team released him with an injury settlement on September 7, 2017.

New York Guardians
In October 2019, Bibbs was selected by the New York Guardians in the sixth round of the 2020 XFL Draft. He had his contract terminated when the league suspended operations on April 10, 2020.

New Orleans Breakers
On March 10, 2022, Bibbs was drafted by the New Orleans Breakers of the United States Football League. He was transferred to the team's inactive roster on April 22, 2022.

References

External links
 Iowa State Cyclones bio
 Cleveland Browns bio

1991 births
American football tight ends
Iowa State Cyclones football players
African-American players of American football
Living people
Players of American football from Chicago
Arizona Western Matadors football players
Cleveland Browns players
Jacksonville Jaguars players
Washington Redskins players
New York Guardians players
21st-century African-American sportspeople
New Orleans Breakers (2022) players